Benthos, also known as benthon, is the community of organisms that live on, in, or near the bottom of a sea, river, lake, or stream, also known as the benthic zone. This community lives in or near marine or freshwater sedimentary environments, from tidal pools along the foreshore, out to the continental shelf, and then down to the abyssal depths.

Many organisms adapted to deep-water pressure cannot survive in the upper parts of the water column. The pressure difference can be very significant (approximately one atmosphere for every 10 metres of water depth).

Because light is absorbed before it can reach deep ocean water, the energy source for deep benthic ecosystems is often organic matter from higher up in the water column that drifts down to the depths. This dead and decaying matter sustains the benthic food chain; most organisms in the benthic zone are scavengers or detritivores.

The term benthos, coined by Haeckel in 1891, comes from the Greek noun  'depth of the sea'. Benthos is used in freshwater biology to refer to organisms at the bottom of freshwater bodies of water, such as lakes, rivers, and streams. There is also a redundant synonym, Benton.

Overview
Compared to the relatively featureless pelagic zone, the benthic zone offers physically diverse habitats. There is a huge range in how much light and warmth is available, and in the depth of water or extent of intertidal immersion. The seafloor varies widely in the types of sediment it offers. Burrowing animals can find protection and food in soft, loose sediments such as mud, clay and sand. Sessile species such as oysters and barnacles can attach themselves securely to hard, rocky substrates. As adults they can remain at the same site, shaping depressions and crevices where mobile animals find refuge. This greater diversity in benthic habitats has resulted in a higher diversity of benthic species. The number of benthic animal species exceeds one million. This far exceeds the number of pelagic animal species (about 5000 larger zooplankton species, 22,000 pelagic fish species and 110 marine mammal species).

By size

Macrobenthos

Macrobenthos, prefix , comprises the larger, visible to the naked eye, benthic organisms greater than about 1 mm in size. Some examples are polychaete worms, bivalves, echinoderms, sea anemones, corals, sponges, sea squirts, turbellarians and larger crustaceans such as crabs, lobsters and cumaceans.

Meiobenthos

Meiobenthos, prefix , comprises tiny benthic organisms that are less than about 1 mm but greater than about 0.1 mm in size. Some examples are nematodes, foraminiferans, tardigrades, gastrotriches and smaller crustaceans such as copepods and ostracodes.

Microbenthos

Microbenthos, prefix from the Greek mikrós 'small', comprises microscopic benthic organisms that are less than about 0.1 mm in size. Some examples are bacteria, diatoms, ciliates, amoeba, flagellates.

Marine microbenthos are microorganisms that live in the benthic zone of the ocean – that live near or on the seafloor, or within or on surface seafloor sediments. The word benthos comes from Greek, meaning "depth of the sea". Microbenthos are found everywhere on or about the seafloor of continental shelves, as well as in deeper waters, with greater diversity in or on seafloor sediments. In shallow waters, seagrass meadows, coral reefs and kelp forests provide particularly rich habitats. In photic zones benthic diatoms dominate as photosynthetic organisms. In intertidal zones changing tides strongly control opportunities for microbenthos.

Both foraminifera and diatoms have planktonic and benthic forms, that is, they can drift in the water column or live on sediment at the bottom of the ocean. Either way, their shells end up on the seafloor after they die. These shells are widely used as climate proxies. The chemical composition of the shells are a consequence of the chemical composition of the ocean at the time the shells were formed. Past water temperatures can be also be inferred from the ratios of stable oxygen isotopes in the shells, since lighter isotopes evaporate more readily in warmer water leaving the heavier isotopes in the shells. Information about past climates can be inferred further from the abundance of forams and diatoms, since they tend to be more abundant in warm water.

The sudden extinction event which killed the dinosaurs 66 million years ago also rendered extinct three-quarters of all other animal and plant species. However, deep-sea benthic forams flourished in the aftermath. In 2020 it was reported that researchers have examined the chemical composition of thousands of samples of these benthic forams and used their findings to build the most detailed climate record of Earth ever.

Some endoliths have extremely long lives. In 2013 researchers reported evidence of endoliths in the ocean floor, perhaps millions of years old, with a generation time of 10,000 years. These are slowly metabolizing and not in a dormant state. Some Actinomycetota found in Siberia are estimated to be half a million years old.

By type

Zoobenthos
Zoobenthos, prefix , animals belonging to the benthos.

Phytobenthos
Phytobenthos, prefix , plants belonging to the benthos, mainly benthic diatoms and macroalgae (seaweed).

By location

Endobenthos
Endobenthos (or endobenthic), prefix , lives buried, or burrowing in the sediment, often in the oxygenated top layer, e.g., a sea pen or a sand dollar.

Epibenthos
Epibenthos (or epibenthic), prefix , lives on top of the sediments, e.g., like a sea cucumber or a sea snail crawling about. Unlike other epiphytes.

Hyperbenthos
Hyperbenthos (or hyperbenthic), prefix , lives just above the sediment, e.g., a rock cod.

Food sources

The main food sources for the benthos are algae and organic runoff from land. The depth of water, temperature and salinity, and type of local substrate all affect what benthos is present. In coastal waters and other places where light reaches the bottom, benthic photosynthesizing diatoms can proliferate. Filter feeders, such as sponges and bivalves, dominate hard, sandy bottoms. Deposit feeders, such as polychaetes, populate softer bottoms. Fish, such as dragonets, as well as sea stars, snails, cephalopods, and crustaceans are important predators and scavengers.

Benthic organisms, such as sea stars, oysters, clams, sea cucumbers, brittle stars and sea anemones, play an important role as a food source for fish, such as the California sheephead, and humans.

Ecological role

Benthos as bioindicators 
Benthic macro-invertebrates play a critical role in aquatic ecosystems. These organisms can be used to indicate the presence, concentration, and effect of water pollutants in the aquatic environment. Some water contaminants—such as nutrients, chemicals from surface runoff, and metals—settle in the sediment of river beds, where many benthos reside. Benthos are highly sensitive to contamination, so their close proximity to high pollutant concentrations make these organisms ideal for studying water contamination.

Benthos can be used as bioindicators of water pollution through ecological population assessments or through analyzing biomarkers. In ecological population assessments, a relative value of water pollution can be detected. Observing the number and diversity of macro-invertebrates in a waterbody can indicate the pollution level. In highly contaminated waters, a reduced number of organisms and only pollution-tolerant species will be found. In biomarker assessments, quantitative data can be collected on the amount of and direct effect of specific pollutants in a waterbody. The biochemical response of macro-invertebrates' internal tissues can be studied extensively in the laboratory. The concentration of a chemical can cause many changes, including changing feeding behaviors, inflammation, and genetic damage, effects that can be detected outside of the stream environment. Biomarker analysis is important for mitigating the negative impacts of water pollution because it can detect water pollution before it has a noticeable ecological effect on benthos populations.

Carbon processing

Organic matter produced in the sunlit layer of the ocean and delivered to the sediments is either consumed by organisms or buried. The organic matter consumed by organisms is used to synthesize biomass or is metabolized to carbon dioxide and nutrients. In the long-term or at steady-state, i.e., the biomass of benthic organisms does not change, the benthic community can be considered a black box diverting organic matter into either metabolites or the geosphere (burial).

See also

 Aphotic zone
 Benthic fish
 Benthopelagic fish
 Bioirrigation
 Bottom feeder
 Deep sea
 Deep sea communities
 Deep sea mining
 Demersal fish
 Intertidal ecology
 Littoral
 Neritic zone
 Nekton
 Plankton
 Pelagic zone
 Photic zone
 Profundal zone
 Sediment Profile Imagery (SPI)
 Stream bed

Notes

References 
 "Benthos". (2008) Encyclopædia Britannica. (Retrieved May 15, 2008, from Encyclopædia Britannica Online.)
 Ryan, Paddy (2007) "Benthic communities" Te Ara - the Encyclopædia of New Zealand, updated 21 September 2007.
 Yip, Maricela and Madl, Pierre (1999) "Benthos" University of Salzburg.

External links
 "Benthos"

Marine organisms
Biology terminology
Oceanographical terminology